= Museum of Seawall Site of Hangzhou =

Museum in Hangzhou

- Chinese: 杭州海塘遗址博物馆
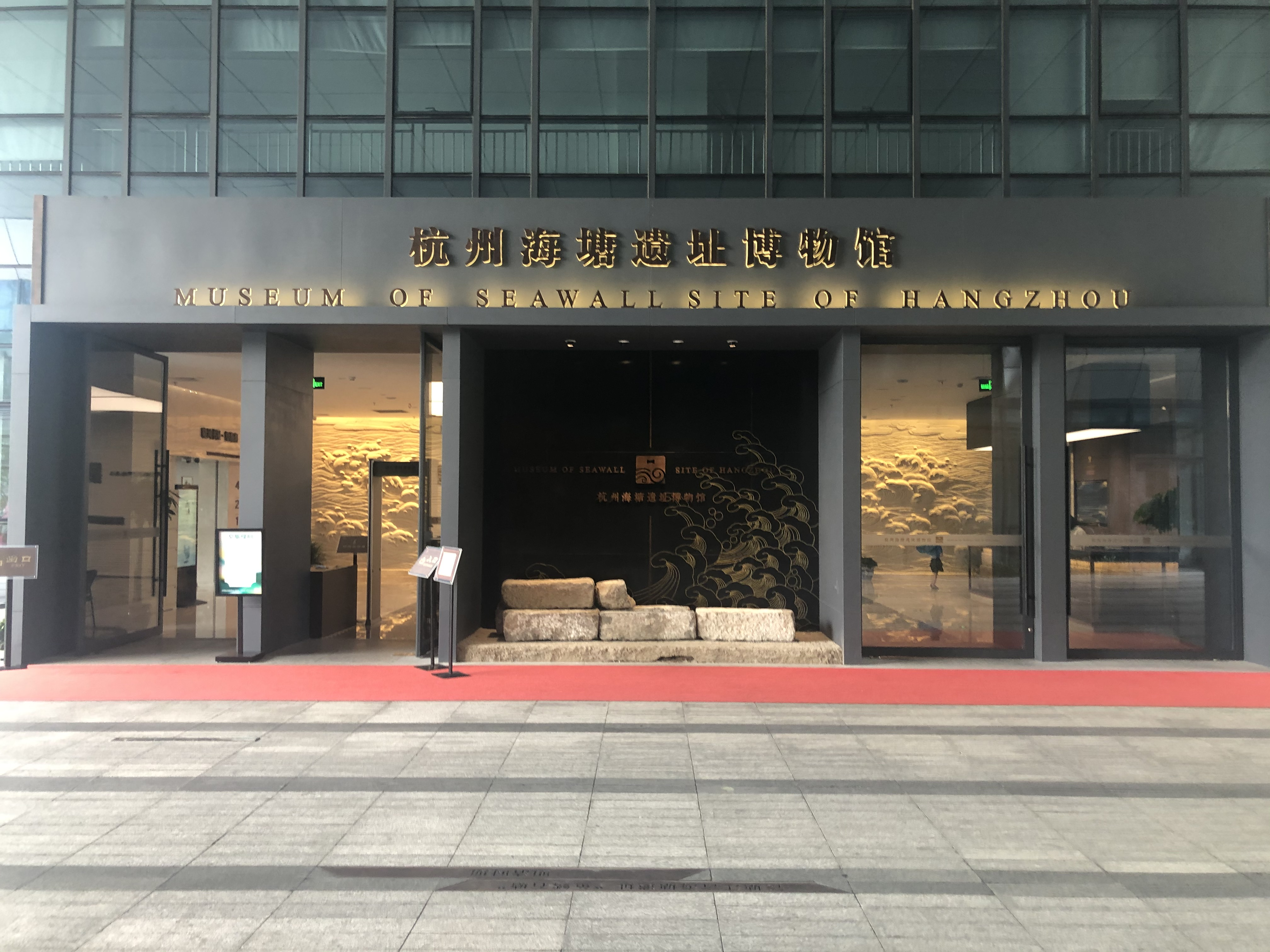
- Entrance to the Museum of Seawall Site of Hangzhou

- Location within Zhejiang Location within China
- Established: 7 January 2020
- Coordinates: 30°18′42″N 120°16′00″E

The Hangzhou Seawall Ruins Museum (Chinese: 杭州海塘遗址博物馆) is an archeological site museum of seawalls located in Hangzhou, China. It is also the first seawall museum in China. It opened in Jan. 7th, 2020.

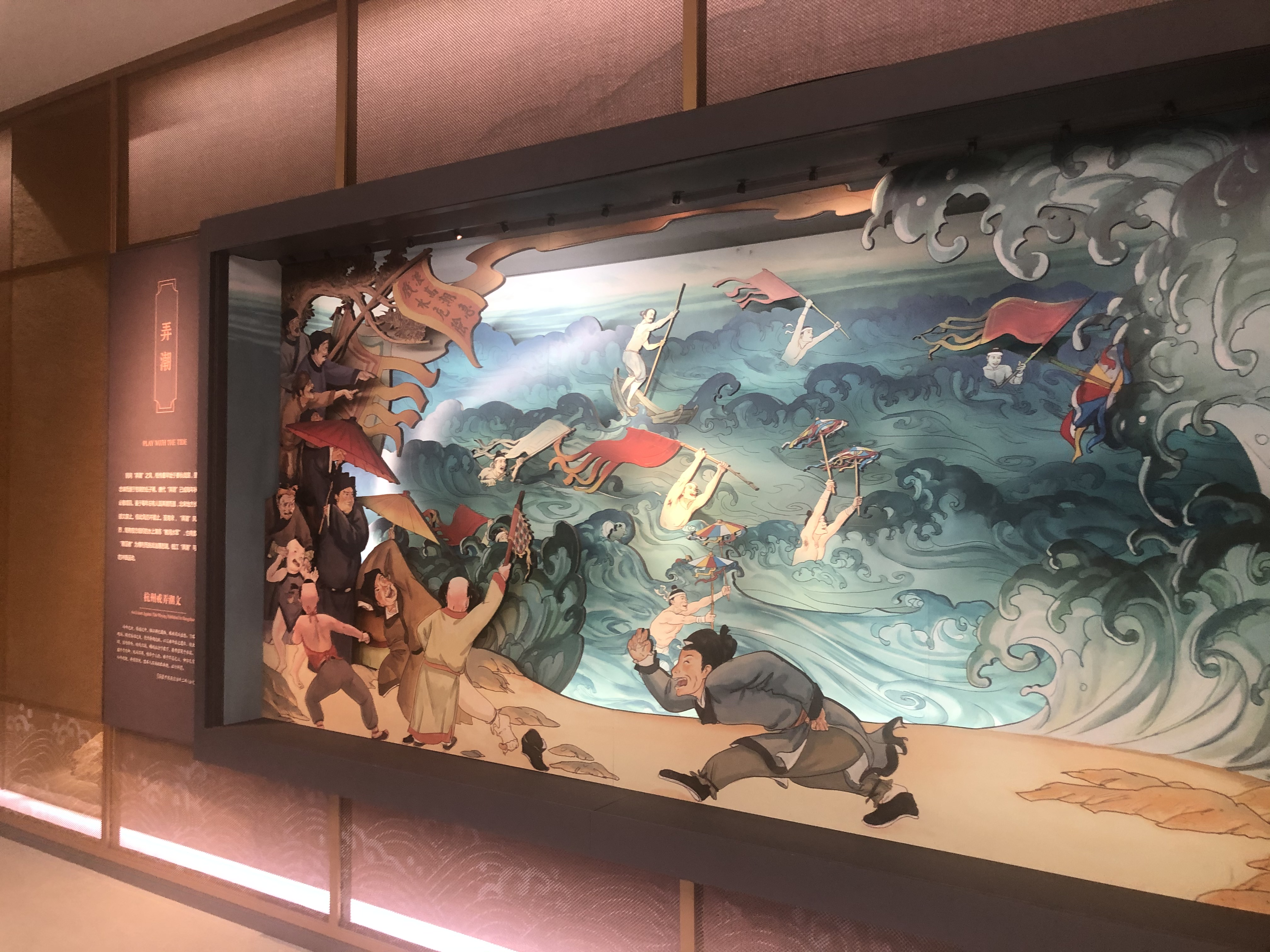
Old custom to surf the tidal bores.
